Simon Moore is a British screenwriter, director, and playwright. He is best known as writer for the 1989 six-part BBC miniseries about the international illegal drug trade, Traffik, the basis for the 2000 American crime film Traffic and the 2004 three-part USA network miniseries by the same name.

Moore won a Primetime Emmy Award in the Outstanding Writing for a Miniseries category for his script for Gulliver's Travels (miniseries).

Career
He wrote and directed the 1991 film noir Under Suspicion. He wrote the 1995 cult Western The Quick and the Dead in late 1992, writing it as a homage to the Spaghetti Westerns of Sergio Leone, particularly the Dollars Trilogy starring Clint Eastwood. The writer decided the lead character should be a female. "When you introduce women into that kind of world, something very interesting happens and you have an interesting dynamic straight away," Moore commented. The names of the lead villain (Herod) and the town (Redemption) were intentional allusions to the Bible. Moore considered directing his own script as an independent film and shooting The Quick and the Dead on a $3–4 million budget in either Spain or Italy. Sony Pictures Entertainment purchased Moore's script in May 1993. 

Moore wrote the screenplay for the 1996 adaptation of Gulliver's Travels (miniseries), which won five Emmys, including Outstanding Miniseries and Outstanding Writing for a Miniseries for Moore. He also wrote the fantasy miniseries, The 10th Kingdom, and the Disney ABC miniseries, Dinotopia.  

As  playwright, he adapted Stephen King's novel Misery for the stage, with the play premiering in London's West End theatre in 1992 and revived in London in 2005.

Personal life
Moore lives in Los Angeles, California.

References

External links
 

20th-century British dramatists and playwrights
20th-century British screenwriters
21st-century British screenwriters
British film directors
British television writers
British male screenwriters
Year of birth missing (living people)
Living people
Emmy Award winners